Sharon Kam (born August 11, 1971) is an Israeli–German clarinetist. She won the ARD International Music Competition in 1992.

Biography 

After completing her music studies at the Juilliard School of Music in New York, where she studied clarinet with Charles Neidich, she made her orchestral debut as a 16-year-old with the Israel Philharmonic Orchestra under Zubin Mehta. In 1992, she won the ARD International Music Competition, followed a year later by the Davidoff Prix. In 1998 she received the ECHO Klassik Prize as "Instrumentalist of the Year" for her CD recording of the Weber concertos with the Gewandhaus Orchestra conducted by Kurt Masur. In 2006, she was again awarded for her CD with the Leipzig Radio Orchestra featuring works by Spohr, Weber, Rossini and Mendelssohn. Her 2002 CD "American Classics" with the London Symphony Orchestra under the direction of Gregor Bühl was awarded the German Record Critics' Prize.

Kam's interpretation of the Mozart concerto as part of Mozart's 250th anniversary in 2006 at the Prague National Theater was broadcast live on television in 33 countries and is available on DVD. The same year, she realized her dream of recording Mozart's clarinet concerto and quintet, playing the basset clarinet.

Kam has given concertos worldwide with major orchestras such as the Chicago Symphony Orchestra, the Berlin Philharmonic, the Israel Philharmonic Orchestra, London Symphony Orchestra, and Leipzig Gewandhaus Orchestra. She was "Artist in Residence" at the Bodensee Festival in 2011.

Kam is also active in the field of chamber music and works regularly with artists such as Lars Vogt, Christian Tetzlaff, Daniel Müller-Schott, Enrico Pace, Leif Ove Andsnes, Carolin Widmann and the Jerusalem Quartet. Is a frequent guest at a number of festivals.

In the realm of contemporary music, she has premiered many works, including Krzysztof Penderecki's concerto and quartet, as well as concertos by Herbert Willi (at the Salzburg Festival), Iván Erőd and Peter Ruzicka (in Donaueschingen).

Kam married the conductor Gregor Bühl in 1994, has two children and lives with her family in Hanover.

Kam plays on Buffet Crampon clarinets.

Selected recordings 
 The Romantic Clarinet (Rietz: Klarinettenkonzert op. 29, Bruch: Konzert für Klarinette, Viola & Orchester op. 88, Weber: Klarinettenquintett op. 34 arr. für Streichorchester) 2007.
 Mozart Gala From Prague / Clarinet Concerto (Don Giovanni: Overture, K.527, Concerto for Clarinet and Orchestra in A major, K.622, Symphony No.38 in D major, K.504 "Prague") 2006.
 Works for Clarinet and Orchestra (Mendelssohn: Two Concert pieces for Clarinet, basset-horn and Orchestra, op. 113 and op.114, Spohr: Concerto Nr. 4 in e minor, Weber: Concertino op. 26, Rossini: Introduction, Theme and Variations) 2005.
 Sharon Kam – Artist Portrait 2003.
 American Classics (Copland: Concerto for clarinet, Bernstein: Prelude, Fugue and Riffs, Gould: Derivations for clarinet and Band, Shaw: Concerto for clarinet, Gershwin: Summertime, They All Laughed, The Man I Love, I Got Rhythm) 2002.
 Mozart and Krommer Concertos (Mozart- Clarinet Concerto, Krommer- Clarinet Concerto)

There is no Blu-ray with Kam and only one DVD, the Mozart Quintet, played on a basset clarinet. She is represented on YouTube, Spotify and Deezer.

References

Further reading

External links 

 Official site

1971 births
Living people
Musicians from Haifa
Musicians from Hanover
Israeli emigrants to Germany
German people of Israeli descent
Naturalized citizens of Germany
Israeli classical clarinetists
German classical clarinetists
20th-century clarinetists
21st-century clarinetists